Ashley is a place name derived from the Old English words æsc (“ash”) and lēah (“meadow”). It may refer to:

People and fictional characters
 Ashley (given name), a list of people and fictional characters with the given name
 Ashley (surname), a list of people
 Ashley (singer) (born 1975), Puerto Rican singer
 Ashley, South Korean singer and leader of Ladies' Code

Places

Australia
 Ashley, New South Wales

England
 Ashley, Cambridgeshire
 Ashley, Cheshire
 Ashley, Gloucestershire
 Ashley, East Hampshire
 Ashley, New Forest, Hampshire
 Ashley, Test Valley, Hampshire
 Ashley, Kent
 Ashley, Northamptonshire
 Ashley, Staffordshire
 Ashley, Wiltshire
 Ashley (Bristol ward)

New Zealand
 Ashley, New Zealand
 Ashley (New Zealand electorate), a former electorate 1866–1902

United States
 Ashley County, Arkansas
 Ashley, Illinois
 Ashley, Indiana
 Ashley, Michigan
 Ashley, Missouri
 Ashley, North Dakota
 Ashley, Ohio
 Ashley, Pennsylvania
 Ashley, West Virginia
 Ashley, Wisconsin
 Ashley River, South Carolina

Music
 "Ashley", a 2008 song from This War Is Ours by Escape the Fate
 "Ashley", a 2008 song from Visiter by The Dodos
 "Ashley", a 2012 song from ¡Dos! by Green Day
 "Ashley", a 2020 songy from Manic by Halse

Other uses
 Ashley (automobile), a kit car manufactured in England from 1954 to 1962
 Ashley (restaurant), a South Korean restaurant chain
 Ashley Furniture, an American furniture company
 Ashley Script, a typeface created by Ashley Havinden
 Ashley Treatment, a controversial treatment for static encephalopathy

See also
 The Ashley Book of Knots, a reference manual on the use, history, appearance, and tying of knots by Clifford Ashley
 Aşlı, a medieval Volga Bulgarian town